Turners are members of German-American gymnastic clubs called Turnvereine. They promoted German culture, physical culture, and liberal politics. Turners, especially Francis Lieber, 1798–1872, were the leading sponsors of gymnastics as an American sport and the field of academic study.

In Germany, a major gymnastic movement was started by Turnvater ("father of gymnastics") and nationalist Friedrich Ludwig Jahn in the early 19th century when Germany was occupied by Napoleon. The Turnvereine ("gymnastic unions"; from German turnen meaning “to practice gymnastics,” and Verein meaning “club, union”) were not only athletic but also political, reflecting their origin in similar ethnocentric "national gymnastic" organizations in Europe (such as the Czech Sokol), who were participants in various national movements for independence. The Turner movement in Germany was generally liberal in nature, and many Turners took part in the Revolutions of 1848.

After the failure of the 1848 Revolution in Germany, the Turner movement was suppressed, and many Turners left Germany, some emigrating to the United States, especially to the Ohio Valley region, Wisconsin, Missouri, and Texas. Several of these Forty-Eighters went on to become Union soldiers, and some became Republican politicians. Besides serving as physical education, social, political, and cultural organizations for German immigrants, Turners were also active in public education and labor movements. They were leading promoters of gymnastics in the United States as a sport and as a school subject. In the United States, the movement declined after 1900, and especially after 1917.

History in the United States 

The Turner movement was preceded by the first wave of gymnastics in the United States in the 1820s, led by Germans, such as Charles Beck and Charles Follen, and Americans, such as John Neal. Beck opened the first gymnasium in the U.S. in 1825 at the Round Hill School in Northampton, Massachusetts. Follen opened the first college gymnasium and the first public gymnasium in the States in 1826 at Harvard College and in Boston, Massachusetts, respectively. Neal was the first American to open a public gymnasium in the U.S. in Portland, Maine in 1827. He also documented and promoted these early efforts in the American Journal of Education and The Yankee, helping to establish the American branch of the movement.

The Turnvereine made a contribution to the integration of German-Americans into their new home. The organizations continue to exist in areas of heavy German immigration, such as Iowa, Texas, Wisconsin, Indiana, Ohio, Minnesota, Missouri, Syracuse, NY, Kentucky, New York City, Sacramento, and Los Angeles.

About 1000 Turners served as Union soldiers during the Civil War. Anti-slavery was a common element, as typified by Carl Schurz. Many Republican leaders in German communities were members. They provided the bodyguard at Abraham Lincoln's inauguration on March 4, 1861, and at his funeral in April 1865. In the Camp Jackson Affair, a large force of German volunteers helped prevent Confederate forces from seizing the government arsenal in St. Louis just prior to the beginning of the war.  After the Civil War, the national organization took a new name, Nordamerikanischer Turnerbund, and supported German-language teaching in public high schools, as well as gymnastics. Women's auxiliaries were formed in the 1850s and 1860s. The high point in membership came in 1894, with 317 societies and about 40,000 adult male members, along with 25,000 children and 3000 women.

In the 1904 Olympics several competitors represented various Tuners organizations in Missouri, Illinois, Pennsylvania, New Jersey and New York, and some of the teams at the Olympics were sponsored by Turners organizations.

Like other German-American groups, the Turners experienced suspicion during World War I, even though they now had very little contact with Germany. German-language instruction ended at many schools and universities, and the federal government imposed restrictions on German-language publications. The younger generation generally demanded the switch to the exclusive use of English society affairs, which allowed many Turner societies to continue to function.

Cultural assimilation and both World Wars with Germany took a gradual toll on membership, with some halls closing and others becoming regular dance halls, bars, or bowling alleys. As of 2011, 54 Turner societies still existed around the U.S. The current headquarters of American Turners is in Louisville, Kentucky.

In 1948, the US Post Office issued a 3-cent commemorative stamp to mark the 100th anniversary of the movement in the country.

The Turnverein in Sacramento, founded in 1854, claims to be the oldest still in existence in the United States. The Turnverein Vorwaerts of Fort Wayne, Indiana, owned the Hugh McCulloch House from 1906 until 1966.  It was listed on the National Register of Historic Places in 1980.

Gallery

Vintage photos of the Milwaukee Turnverein

Other Wisconsin Turners in 1915

Monuments in the United States

Jahn Monument in Berlin with memorial plaques from American Turnvereine

Turner Halls

See also 
 German-Americans in the Civil War
 George Brosius
 Forty-Eighters
 Sokol, A comparable movement for Czechs in Central Europe (Austria-Hungary) and the United States

References

Further reading 
 Barney, Robert Knight. "German Turners in America: Their Role in Nineteenth Century Exercise Expression and Physical Education Legislation." in  Earle F. Zeigler ed., American Sport and Physical Education History (to 1875) (1975): 116+. online
 Barney, Robert Knight. "Knights of Cause and Exercise: German Forty-Eighters and Turnvereine in the United States during the Antebellum Period." Canadian Journal of History of Sport 13.2 (1982): 62-79.
 Barney, Robert Knight. "America's First Turnverein: Commentary in Favor of Louisville, Kentucky." Journal of Sport History 11.1 (1984): 134-137. online
Hoyt, D. J. (1999). A strong mind in a strong body: Libraries in the German-American Turner movement. New York, NY: Peter Land.
 Kramer, William M., and Norton B. Stern. "The Turnverein: A German Experience for Western Jewry." Western States Jewish History 16 (1984): 227.
 Metzner, Henry. A brief history of the American Turnerbund (1924) online>
 Pfister, Gertrud. "The Role of German Turners in American Physical Education," International Journal of the History of Sport 26 (no. 13, 2009) 1893-925
 Pumroy, Eric, and Katja Rampelmann. Research guide to the Turner movement in the United States (Greenwood, 1996).

External links 
Website of the American Turners
Archives of the American Turners
American Turner Topics newsletter
Website of the Los Angeles Turners with history, photos, newsletters, and links to other Turners Organizations
 The American Turners, Wilmington Records and the Roxborough Turners Records, including by-laws, correspondence, minutes and photographs, are available for research use at the Historical Society of Pennsylvania.

German-American history
German-American culture
German-American organizations
American Civil War political groups
Gymnastics organizations
Gymnastics in the United States
Physical culture
Politics and sports
Sports organizations established in 1848
People associated with physical culture